Men's Wear is a 1953 painting by Australian artist John Brack. The painting depicts the interior of a menswear store, including the proprietor and some mannequins, standing in front of displays of ties and trousers. A mirror in the background reflects a silhouette of the artist.

Brack painted the work while he was Art Master at Melbourne Grammar School. It is one of a series of paintings, including The Barber's Shop (1952) and The Fish Shop (1955) of small high street businesses.

The painting was acquired by the National Gallery of Australia in 1982 and is now part of its Australian Art collection.

References

Paintings by John Brack
1953 paintings
Collections of the National Gallery of Australia
Culture of Melbourne